The 2011 Air Force Falcons football team represented the United States Air Force Academy in the 2011 NCAA Division I FBS football season. The Falcons were led by fifth-year head coach Troy Calhoun and played their home games at Falcon Stadium. They are members of the Mountain West Conference. They finished the season 7–6, 3–4 in Mountain West play to finish in fifth place. They were invited to the Military Bowl where they were defeated by Toledo, 42–41. With wins over Army and Navy, Air Force won the Commander-in-Chief's Trophy for the second consecutive year.

Schedule

Depth chart

Game summaries

Navy

Army

References

Air Force
Air Force Falcons football seasons
Air Force Falcons football